Line 6 is a musical instrument and audio equipment manufacturer. Their product lines include electric and acoustic guitars, basses, guitar and bass amplifiers, effects units, USB audio interfaces and guitar/bass wireless systems. The company was founded in 1996 and is headquartered in Calabasas, California.

Since December 2013, it has been a wholly owned subsidiary of the Yamaha Corporation.

Origin of the company

Marcus Ryle and Michel Doidic (two former Oberheim designers) co-founded Fast-Forward Designs, where they helped develop several notable pro audio products such as the Alesis ADAT, Quadraverbs and QuadraSynth, and Digidesign SampleCell. As digital signal processing became more and more powerful and affordable during the 1980s, they began developing DSP-based products for guitarists. As Ryle tells the story, the name "Line 6" came about because the phone system at Fast-Forward Designs only had 5 lines. Because the new guitar-related products were developed in secrecy, the receptionist used "Line 6" as a code word of sorts, and paging them for a call on Line 6 meant to stop any guitar or amp-related sounds so that they wouldn't be overheard by other Fast-Forward clients or callers.

History
Line 6 launched in 1996, with their first digital-modeling guitar amplifier, the AxSys 212, a combo amp using two 12" speakers. This was followed in 1997 by the Flextone. The company underwent a rapid expansion in the early 2000s (decade) due to the success of their Pod product line, which isolated modeling circuitry from the AxSys amplifier.

Digital modeling attempts to recreate the unique characteristics of musical instruments and pro audio gear. Early Line 6 products used digital modeling to emulate the signature tone of a guitar amp/speaker combination. Further development of Line 6's modeling technology has extended the emulation to include numerous guitar amplifier / guitar cabinet combinations, guitar effects, microphones, and even different guitars and other fretted instruments themselves. Digital modeling offers countless virtual combinations of a variety of music gear, but only as emulations, however convincing as they may be.

Though Line 6 began with a modeling guitar amp, their breakthrough product line was arguably the POD guitar processor line and its later variants, but this modeling technology has been the foundation for most of Line 6's products, from guitar amps to software and computer audio interfaces. Line 6 has an active user community, and provides software that allows users to easily download and share patches or device settings for many of Line 6's products.

In early 2008, Line 6 acquired X2 Digital Wireless, who had introduced digital wireless systems for guitar. Further developing this technology, Line 6 developed and introduced a family of digital wireless microphone systems in 2010.

In December 2013, it was confirmed that Line 6 was to be bought by Yamaha Corporation, to operate as a wholly owned subsidiary with the internal management remaining the same.

Line 6 products

Guitar amplifiers

Line 6 produces a number of guitar amplifiers (combos and heads), all featuring amplifier modeling software. In 2004, the Spider II 112 combo amp was released.  The Spider III sold over 12,700 units in 2011, the 15-watt Spider IV amp was the best-selling guitar amplifier in America. According to their website, the Spider IV has also been the best-selling 15, 30, 75, and 120 watt amps. The latest model is the Spider V.

Pedalboards/stomp boxes

Pedal boards range from Pod amp modelers to modeling pedals for delay and other effects, as well as a jam looper. In 2015 Line 6 announced their 'next generation' multi-effects processor/ pedalboard named Helix, similar in function to the Floor Pod and Pod Live series, but with a redesigned interface and body.

Portable recording devices
The BackTrack and BackTrack+Mic are portable recording devices for electric and acoustic guitars, respectively.

Audio interfaces/effects processors
The earlier audio interface produced by Line 6, GuitarPort, is replaced by the TonePort line. POD amp modelers are available in a number of versions.

Musical instruments

Variax is a line of acoustic, bass and electric guitars. Some of the original development team members for the first Variax model introduced in 2002 moved on to other companies, including Damage Control USA and Vox Amplification Ltd.

Software
Line 6 software includes the Variax Workbench, a software application that can interface a home computer with a Variax electric guitar; the Gearbox, tone editing software; and Pod Farm, which contains all of the modeling features of the POD X3 emulated on the computer.

Wireless systems
In May 2008, Line 6 announced it had acquired X2 Digital Wireless; it now sells wireless systems for guitar, bass, vocals and wind instruments. Spider V 60 MkII, Spider V 120 MkII, Spider V 240 MkII, and Spider V 240HC MkII all feature built in wireless and are compatible with most Line 6 wireless transmitters.

POD product history

Guitar Hero World Tour
Line 6 products were placed in Guitar Hero World Tour. Line 6 guitar and bass amplifiers can be found on stage. In the Guitar Hero World Tour "Music Studio", gamers can use a stylized Line 6 POD to create their own songs.

References

External links

 Official website
 Audio interview with Line 6 founder Marcus Ryle
 Marcus Ryle Interview NAMM Oral History Program (2007)
 Michel Doidic Interview NAMM Oral History Program (2011)

Audio equipment manufacturers of the United States
Guitar manufacturing companies of the United States
Guitar amplifier manufacturers
Manufacturing companies established in 1996
Guitar effects manufacturing companies
Companies based in Calabasas, California
1996 establishments in California
2014 mergers and acquisitions
Yamaha Corporation